Wayne Arthurs and Paul Hanley won in the final 6–2, 6–4 against Zeng Shaoxuan and Zhu Benqiang.

Seeds
Champion seeds are indicated in bold text while text in italics indicates the round in which those seeds were eliminated.

 Wayne Arthurs /  Paul Hanley (champions)
 Martín García /  Graydon Oliver (quarterfinals)
 Scott Humphries /  Mark Merklein (first round)
 Todd Perry /  Thomas Shimada (quarterfinals)

Draw

External links
 2003 Shanghai Open Doubles Draw

Kingfisher Airlines Tennis Open
2003 ATP Tour